La Pelu was a 2013 Argentine humoristic program, aired by Telefe, starring Florencia de la V.

Awards

Nominations
 2013 Martín Fierro Awards
 Best humoristic program

References

Telefe original programming
2013 Argentine television series debuts
2013 Argentine television series endings